Karla Erbová (born Fremrová; pseudonym: K. Papežová) (born 1933 in Plzeň) is a contemporary Czech poet, prose writer, and journalist. Many of her writings are historical or mythological in subject matter, often including works on Ancient Greece.

References

External links 
Karla Erbová at the Portal of Czech Literature 

1933 births
Living people
Czech poets
Czech women writers
Writers from Plzeň